Hopea glabrifolia is a species of plant in the family Dipterocarpaceae. It is endemic to Papua New Guinea.

References

Trees of Papua New Guinea
glabrifolia
Data deficient plants
Taxonomy articles created by Polbot